Paralympic judo at the 2018 Asian Para Games in Jakarta took place between 8 and 11 October 2018.

Medal table
One silver medal was not awarded due to doping violation of the original gold medalist of men's 81 kg.

Medalists

Men

Women

See also
Judo at the 2018 Asian Games

References

External links
 
 Judo - Asian Para Games 2018
 RESULT SYSTEM - ASIAN PARA GAMES JAKARTA 2018

2018 Asian Para Games events
2018
Asian Para Games
Asian Para Games, 2018